Meghalaya Football Association (MFA) is one of the 37 Indian state football associations that are affiliated to the All India Football Federation. It is the state-level governing body of football in Meghalaya, India. The Meghalaya football team is also administered by MFA.

Competitions

Shillong Sports Association

Men's
The Shillong Premier League (SPL) is a regional professional football league in Indian state of Meghalaya, organised by the Shillong Sports Association (SSA). It started with 8 teams in 2010. Shillong Lajong FC are the current champions.

Women's
The SSA Women's Football League is the top division of women's football league in the Indian state of Meghalaya and is organised by the Shillong Sports Association (SSA).

Meghalaya State League
The inaugural Meghalaya State League organised by the Meghalaya Football Association was held in 2017–18 which was won by Niaw Wasa. The next 2019 edition was won by Shillong Lajong FC.

Affiliated clubs

References

Football governing bodies in India
Football in Meghalaya
1976 establishments in Meghalaya
Sports organizations established in 1976